A cupola is a relatively small, most often dome-like, tall structure on top of a building.

Cupola may also refer to:

Science, mathematics, and technology
 Cupola (cave formation), a recess in the ceiling of a lava tube
 Cupola (geology), a type of igneous rock intrusion
 Cupola (geometry), a geometric solid
 Cupola (ISS module), an observation dome on the International Space Station
 Cupola (military), a small gun turret mounted on a larger one
 Cupola gecko, a species of gecko
 Cupola sign, in medicine, a radiologic sign
 Cupola furnace, a variety of small blast furnace
 Reverberatory furnace, for smelting some non-ferrous metals
 Cupola, an observation area on top of a railway caboose

Other uses
 Sicilian Mafia Commission or Cupola, a body of Sicilian Mafia leaders
 The Cupola (mountain), Tasmania, Australia
 The Cupola, the yearbook of Western New England University, Springfield, Massachusetts, US
 "Cupola", a 2001 song by Zeromancer from Eurotrash

See also
Cupola House (disambiguation)
Copala (disambiguation)
Coppola (disambiguation)
Copula (disambiguation)
Cupula (disambiguation)